Ishwarganj is a town and municipality in Mymensingh District in the division of Mymensingh. It is the administrative centre and urban centre of Ishwarganj Upazila.

References

Mymensingh